is a Japanese entomologist, author, and a retired professor at the Tokyo University of Agriculture.

Biography
Mitsuhashi graduated from the Faculty of Agriculture program at the University of Tokyo, receiving a Bachelor of Agriculture degree in 1955. In 1965, he received a Doctor of Agriculture degree at the University of Tokyo. He was a professor at the Tokyo University of Agriculture until 2012. His entomology works include scholarly articles and books.

References

External links
Google Scholar

1932 births
Living people
Japanese entomologists
Japanese educators